Martin Luther King School or similar may refer to:

 Martin Luther King High School (disambiguation)
 Martin Luther King Middle School (disambiguation)
 Lycée Martin Luther King (disambiguation)

See also
 Martin Luther King (disambiguation)
 MLK (disambiguation)